Christie Goodwin (born 1962) is an English art photographer who specialises in music photography.

Biography
Goodwin received her BA (hons) in Art Photography from the Royal Academy of Fine Arts in Antwerp in 1986, and worked freelance as a photojournalist for press agencies.  In 2005, she made the move to music photography, when a manager for Status Quo saw her work. She is mainly commissioned for album photography, DVD photography and official tour photography.

She was the official tour photographer on tours for Katy Perry, Ed Sheeran, Taylor Swift, One Direction, Usher, Joe Bonamassa and others. She has worked on several concert movies, including One Direction's One Direction: This Is Us (2013) and Katy Perry's The Prismatic World Tour Live (2015). She has also worked as the house photographer for the Royal Albert Hall in London.

In 2012, she was one of 47 photographers whose work was featured in a London exhibition of photographs of female musicians by women.

References

External links
Official Site

Living people
1962 births
English women photographers
British portrait photographers